The American may refer to:

Film
 The American (1927 film), a Western starring Charles Ray and Bessie Love
 The American (1998 film), a 1998 PBS television adaptation of the Henry James novel
 The American (2010 film), an American thriller starring George Clooney

Music
 The American, a 1999 album by Angie Aparo
 The American, a 1998 album by Martin Sexton
 "The American", a 1981 single by Scottish rock band Simple Minds

Print publications
 The American (novel), an 1877 novel by Henry James
 The American (magazine), a magazine published by the American Enterprise Institute
 The American Magazine, a literary periodical published from 1906 to 1956
 The American (comics), a comic book series by Mark Verheiden
 The American, a 2006 thriller by Andrew Britton
 The American, 2010 retitling of Martin Booth's 1990 novel A Very Private Gentleman

Other uses
 American Athletic Conference, one of the major U.S. collegiate sports conferences
 The American (statue), an unrealized bronze outdoor sculpture planned for Tulsa, Oklahoma
 "The American", character played by Rory Albanese on the satirical podcast, The Bugle
 "The American", racing driver Mike Skinner in the first season of The Grand Tour motoring program

See also 
 America (disambiguation)
 American (disambiguation)
 The Americans (disambiguation)